Alstonia boonei is a very large, deciduous, tropical-forest tree belonging to the Dogbane Family (Apocynaceae). It is native to tropical West Africa, with a range extending into Ethiopia and Tanzania. Its common name in the English timber trade is cheese wood, pattern wood or stool wood (see Ashanti Empire golden stool) while its common name in the French timber trade is emien (derived from the vernacular of the Ivory Coast).

The wood is fine-grained, lending itself to detailed carving. Like many other members of the Apocynaceae (a family rich in toxic and medicinal species), A. boonei contains alkaloids and yields latex.

Description

On the Plateaux Batekes in Congo (Kinshasa)  these trees have greatly swollen bases like those of the Bald Cypress and Water Tupelo. The leaves are borne in whorls at the nodes, the leaf shape is oblanceolate, with the apex rounded to acuminate and the lateral veins (see Leaf#Venation) prominent and almost at right angles to the midrib. The flowers are yellowish-white and borne in lax terminal cymes. The latex is white and abundant.

References

boonei
Flora of Africa
Medicinal plants of Africa
African art
Woodcarving
Plants described in 1914
Taxa named by Émile Auguste Joseph De Wildeman